Mitchell Krueger (born January 12, 1994) is an American tennis player.

Krueger has a career-high singles ranking by the Association of Tennis Professionals (ATP) of world No. 135, achieved on 18 July 2022. He also has a career-high ATP doubles ranking of world No. 173, achieved on 27 April 2015.

Professional career

Krueger received a wildcard into the 2012 US Open mixed doubles event, where he partnered fellow American Samantha Crawford, but lost in the first round.

He made his ATP Tour main-draw debut and recorded first win when he qualified and defeated Benoît Paire for a first of two wins of his career at the 2017 Western & Southern Open and the 2018 BNP Paribas Open.

He made his Grand Slam debut when he qualified into the main draw of the 2018 US Open.

At the 2019 Australian Open, Krueger qualified for the first time at this major but lost to world No. 1, Novak Djokovic, in the first round.

His first Grand slam win was at the 2020 US Open where he defeated Pedro Sousa in the first round as a wildcard.

At the 2022 Delray Beach Open, he reached the second round, defeating Jordan Thompson for his fourth ATP Tour-level win before losing to third seed Grigor Dimitrov.

World TeamTennis
Mitchell enters his second season with World TeamTennis in 2020, after making his debut with the Philadelphia Freedoms in 2019. It was announced he joined the Springfield Lasers during the 2020 WTT season that began on July 12.

Performance timeline

Singles
Current through the 2022 San Diego Open.

ATP Challenger and ITF Futures finals

Singles: 15 (6–9)

Doubles: 26 (8–18)

References

External links
 
 

1994 births
Living people
American male tennis players
Sportspeople from Fort Worth, Texas
Sportspeople from Boca Raton, Florida
Tennis people from Texas
21st-century American people